The Malta Grand Prix was a professional snooker tournament which ran from the 1994/95 season to 2000/2001, sponsored by Rothmans. In 2000 only it was a European ranking tournament.

Winners

References

 
Sport in Valletta
Recurring sporting events established in 1994
Recurring sporting events disestablished in 2001
1994 establishments in Malta
2001 disestablishments in Malta
Grand Prix
International sports competitions hosted by Malta
Defunct snooker competitions
Snooker non-ranking competitions